Koreno nad Horjulom is a settlement in the hills north of Horjul in the Inner Carniola region of Slovenia.

Name
The name of the settlement was changed from Koreno to Koreno nad Horjulom in 1953.

Church

The local church in the settlement is dedicated to Saints Hermagoras and Fortunatus and belongs to the Parish of Horjul.

References

External links
Koreno nad Horjulom on Geopedia

Populated places in the Municipality of Horjul